Schloss Hessen is a schloss or castle in Hessen, Saxony-Anhalt, Germany. It originated as medieval moated castle before being converted into a Renaissance princely palace in the 16th century. Its heyday was as the summer residence of the dukes of Brunswick-Lüneburg in the 17th century. It was later used as a farm house.

Bibliography (in German) 
 Paul Jonas Meier and Karl Steinacker: Die Bau- und Kunstdenkmäler des Kreises Wolfenbüttel. Wolfenbüttel, 1906.
 Johann Royer: Beschreibung des gantzen Fürstlichen Braunschweigischen Gartens zu Hessem. Halberstadt 1648. (Online)
 Thomas Scheliga: ARS TOPIARIA der Renaissance und des Manierismus in Europas Fürstengärten. Ein Beitrag zum Jubiläum „400 Jahre Lustgarten in Hessen am Fallstein“. In: Die Gartenkunst 23 (1/2011), S. 55–70.
 Thomas Scheliga: Schloss und Lustgarten Hessen am Fallstein. Dissertation, Heidelberg 2002. (Online)
 Friedrich Stolberg: Hessen. In: Befestigungsanlagen im und am Harz von der Frühgeschichte bis zur Neuzeit. Hildesheim 1968, S. 173-175.

External links (in German) 

 Website des Fördervereins Schloss Hessen
Beschreibung bei Region Braunschweig Ostfalen
 Rekonstruktionszeichnung von Schloss und Lustgarten
 Beschreibung und Fotos bei braunschweig-touren.de

Hesse
Castles in Saxony-Anhalt